Helmke is a German surname. Notable people with the surname include:

Hannes Helmke (born 1967), German sculptor
Hendrik Helmke (born 1987), German footballer
Paul Helmke (born 1948), American politician
Till Helmke (born 1984), German sprinter

German-language surnames